is a city located in Chiba Prefecture, Japan. , the city had an estimated population of  83,058 in 39,138 households and a population density of 260 persons per km2.

Geography
Kimitsu is located in the southwestern part of Chiba prefecture, about 35 kilometers from the prefectural capital at Chiba, and 40 to 50 kilometers from the center of Tokyo. The northwestern part of the city faces Tokyo Bay and forms a part of the expansive Keiyo Industrial Zone. The inland area is lined with mountains in the Bōsō hills. The city area is the second largest area in Chiba prefecture after Ichihara city. Two small rivers cross Kimitsu, the Koito River and the Obitsu River.

Surrounding municipalities
Chiba Prefecture
Kisarazu
Ichihara
Futtsu
Kamogawa
Ōtaki

Climate
Kimitsu has a humid subtropical climate (Köppen Cfa) characterized by warm summers and cool winters with light to no snowfall.

Demographics
Per Japanese census data, the population of Kimitsu peaked around the year 2000 and has declined since.

History
The area of present-day Kimitsu was largely part of the of Kururi Domain under the Edo period Tokugawa shogunate, centered on the jōkamachi of Kururi Castle. It was divided between Moda District and Sue District in the early Meiji period cadastral reforms. Both districts became part of Kimitsu District from April 1, 1897. The village of Susaki and Yaehara were created with the establishment of the modern municipalities system on April 1, 1889. Kimitsu Town was founded by the merger of these villages on April 1, 1943, and expanded through annexation of two neighboring villages of Sunami and Sadamoto on April 1, 1944. The town continued to expand by annexing the towns of Kazusa and Koito and the villages of Seiwa and Obitsu on September 28, 1970. Kimitsu was elevated to city status on September 1, 1971.

Government
Kimitsu has a mayor-council form of government with a directly elected mayor and a unicameral city council of 22 members. Kimitsu contributes two members to the Chiba Prefectural Assembly. In terms of national politics, the city is part of Chiba 12th district of the lower house of the Diet of Japan.

Economy
Despite its short coastline on Tokyo Bay, the economy of Kimitsu is centered around its coastal belt of heavy industries, primarily by the large-scale steelworks of Nippon Steel's Kimitsu Works. The Koito Fishing Port, technically located in both Kimitsu and Futtsu, is located just north of Cape Futtsu at the mouth of the Koito River. Entry in and out of the fishing port suffers from sediment deposited by the Koito. Kazusa Akademia Park, which spans both Kimitsu and Kisarazu, was established to carry out research in biotechnology and information technology.

Education
Kimitsu has 17 public elementary schools and seven public middle schools operated by the city government, and three public high schools operated by the Chiba Prefectural Board of Education. There is also one private middle school and one private high school. The prefecture also operates one special education school for the handicapped.

Transportation

Railway
 JR East –  Uchibō Line

 JR East –  Kururi Line
 -  -  -  -  -  -

Highways

Local attractions
Kururi Castle
Seiwa Kenmin No Mori Prefectural Park
Kameyama Dam (Kameyama Lake)
Katakura Dam (Sasagawa Lake)
Mishima Dam (Mishima Lake)
Toyofusa Dam (Toyofusa Lake)

International relations

Twin towns and sister cities
Kimitsu is twinned with the following cities.
 Kamogawa, Chiba, Japan
 Uiwang, South Korea

Notable people from Kimitsu
Emi Sakura - professional wrestler
Hiroshi Yamato - professional wrestler
Kōki Yamashita, Japanese professional baseball player (infielder -  Yokohama DeNA BayStars, Nippon Professional Baseball - Central League)
Ryo Hayami, Japanese actor (Kamen Rider X)

References

External links

Official Website 

 
Cities in Chiba Prefecture
Populated coastal places in Japan